Soul Village is an album by pianist Walter Bishop Jr. which was recorded in 1977 and released on the Muse label.

Reception 

Ron Wynn of AllMusic stated "Interesting, often intriguing work that plays off a village concept on the title track, but is otherwise a pretty standard, although expertly performed, batch of standards and bop originals".

Track listing 
All compositions by Walter Bishop Jr. except where noted.
 "Soul Turnaround" – 9:10
 "Valerie" (Walter Bishop Jr., Mitch Farber) – 5:46
 "Sweet Rosa" – 6:43
 "Philadelphia Bright" (Farber) – 6:40
 "Coral Keys" – 5:28
 "Soul Village" – 8:17

Personnel 
Walter Bishop Jr. – electric piano
Randy Brecker – trumpet, flugelhorn
George Young – soprano saxophone, alto saxophone
Gerry Niewood – tenor saxophone, flute
Steve Khan – guitar
Mark Egan – bass
Ed Soph – drums
Victoria – congas, percussion

References 

Walter Bishop Jr. albums
1977 albums
Muse Records albums